In enzymology, a hydrogen:quinone oxidoreductase is an enzyme that catalyzes the chemical reaction

H2 + quinone  quinol

Thus, the two substrates of this enzyme are H2 and quinone, whereas its product is quinol. The quinone can be menaquinone, ubiquinone, demethylmenaquinone or methionaquinone.

This enzyme belongs to the family of oxidoreductases, specifically those acting on hydrogen as donor with a quinone or similar compound as acceptor.  The systematic name of this enzyme class is hydrogen:quinone oxidoreductase. Other names in common use include hydrogen-ubiquinone oxidoreductase, hydrogen:menaquinone oxidoreductase, membrane-bound hydrogenase, and quinone-reactive Ni/Fe-hydrogenase.

References

 
 
 
 
 
 
 
 
 

EC 1.12.5
Enzymes of unknown structure